Murray is a census-designated place (CDP) in the town of Fairfield, Fairfield County, Connecticut, United States. It is in the northern part of Fairfield, with Burr Street running north–south through the center of the CDP. The Merritt Parkway crosses the CDP from east to west, with access from Exit 44 (CT 58, Black Rock Turnpike) at the eastern edge of the community.

Murray was first listed as a CDP prior to the 2020 census.

References 

Census-designated places in Fairfield County, Connecticut
Census-designated places in Connecticut